Talin is a town in the Talin Municipality of the Aragatsotn Province of Armenia. As of the 2011 census, Talin had a population of 5,310. According to the 2016 official estimate, Talin currently has a population of around 3,800. The community is notable for the 7th-century Cathedral of Talin.

Etymology
Talina is most probably the Hellenized version of Talin, used by Ptolemy during the 2nd century.

Talin is a very common feminine name in the Armenian diaspora.

History

Ancient history and Middle Ages
Talin is one of the oldest settlements in modern-day Armenia, with ancient foundations dating back to the 2nd millennium BCE(or roughly four thousand years ago). The first reference to the town of Talin was made by Ptolemy during the 2nd century CE. Ptolemy referred to the settlement as Talina; the Hellenized version of the Armenian name of Talin.

Between the 7th and 10th centuries CE, Talin has been constantly mentioned by many historians, either as a big village or a town under the rule of Kamsarakan Armenian noble family, within the Aragatsotn canton of Ayrarat; the 15th province of Greater Armenia.

In 774 CE, Talin has been seized and its population has been ruled by the Arab Muslims. However, the town has been revived with the establishment of the Bagratid Kingdom of Armenia by the end of the 9th century CE.

The religious complex of the Cathedral of Talin was founded during the late 7th century CE, by prince Nerseh Kamsarakan. During the same period, the Dashtadem Fortress was also built by the Kamsarakan princes at the south of the town.

In 1162 CE, Talin has been severely attacked and destroyed by the invading Seljuks. Most of the town's population was either massacred or fell captive to the Seljuk army.

Dashtadem Fortress of Talin played a vital role as a strategic point at the north of Yerevan, during the wars between the Ottomans and Persians.

16th to 19th centuries
In 1514, Talin was occupied by Selim II after the decisive Ottoman victory over the Safavid Persians in the Battle of Chaldiran. The Armenians of Talin started an uprising against the Ottomans, that led to the massacre of the population of the town by the Ottoman forces.

In 1639, based on the Treaty of Zuhab signed between the Ottomans and Persians, Talin became part of the Erivan Khanate under the rule of Safavid Persia. However, under the Persian rule, the town has gradually lost its significance during the 17th and 18th centuries, eventually turning into a tiny village.

During the 1st half of the 19th century, following the Russo-Persian War in 1826–28, and as a result of the Treaty of Turkmenchay, major territories of Eastern Armenia -including Talin- became part of the Russian Empire in 1829. Many Armenian families from Western Armenia, particularly from Kars, Daruynk and Alashkert, migrated to Talin in 1829-30.

Modern history

At the beginning of the 20th century, during the years of the Armenian genocide, many Armenian refuge families arrived in Talin from the Western Armenian cities of Van, Mush, Alashkert and Karin between 1914-1918. In May 1918, Talin was included within the newly founded Republic of Armenia that lasted until December 1920.

Under the Soviet rule, Talin became the administrative centre of talin raion formed in 1930. In 1964, Talin was given the status of an urban-type settlement.

In 1995, the government of independent Armenia reaffirmed the status of Talin as an urban settlement within the Aragatsotn Province.

In 2019 Talin won Armenian title of the "Clean community of the year".

Geography

Talin is situated at the western foot of Mount Aragats within the Shirak Plain, at a height of 1,585 meters above sea level, near the Arteni Volcano which is located around 6 km west of Talin. The capital Yerevan is at a road distance of 68 km southeast of Talin. The town is surrounded with dry steppes.

Talin has a humid continental climate, characterized with hot/warm summers and extremely cold and snowy winters. The average annual precipitation is 450 mm.

Demographics

Culture

Being one of the oldest centres of civilization in the history of Armenia, the area of Talin is rich with historical monuments. The 7th-century Cathedral of Talin built by the Kamsarakan princes, is a typical example of Armenian church architecture of the early Christian period of the Armenian nation.

Another historical monument in Talin is the 13th-century caravanserai located at the southern vicinity of the town.

During the Soviet period, being the centre of Talin raion, many cultural institutions were opened in the town. Nowadays, Talin has its house of culture, the public library, a school of music, and a geological museum.

The town has its local "Talin Ashkharh" weekly newspaper.

Transportation
Talin is an important intersection in Armenia between north and south. The M-1 Motorway passes through Talin from the southeast to the northwest. Additionally, the M-9 Motorway passes across Talin from the south to the north, separating the town into two parts.

Regular mini bus trips facilitate the transportation between Talin and Yerevan, Gyumri, Ashtarak and the surrounding villages.

Economy

The citizens of Talin are mainly involved in agriculture. Cattle-breeding is common in the rural areas around Talin. Beekeeping farms are also found at higher woodlands.

On the other hand, gemstones production is quite developed in Talin. Currently, the "DiamoTech" Factory for gemstones and jewelry is operating in the town since 2004.

Additionally, Talin is home to the "Bonilat" factory for dairy products founded in 2005, on the basis of the former Talin cheese factory. The town is also home to the "Avetsiyan Aghek" plant for soft drinks. An asphalt and bitumen plant is also operating since the Soviet days. The town has many small enterprises for dairy and bakery products.

As of November 2017, Talin is home to the largest solar power plant in Armenia. The 1 MW "Talin-1" solar power plant was officially opened on November 7, 2017, as a private project initiated by local investors and financed by the KfW German development bank.

Education
As of 2017, Talin is home to 2 primary schools and a high school. Many pre-school kindergartens are also operating in the town.

The Aragatsotn Regional State college is a state-owned intermediate technical college based in Talin.

Sport
Like the rest of the regions in Armenia, Football is the most popular sport in Talin. A sports school run by the municipality is currently operating in the town with a football training field located at the northwest of the town centre.

People 

 Samvel Mkrtchyan

See also 
Talin Cathedral

References

External links
 Talin Cathedral at Armenica.org

Populated places in Aragatsotn Province
Populated places established in the 2nd century
Yazidi populated places in Armenia